The Constitution Alteration (Organised Marketing of Primary Products) Bill 1946, was an unsuccessful proposal to alter the Australian Constitution to give the Commonwealth explicit power to make laws for the organised marketing of primary products and to exempt it from the freedom of interstate trade requirement of section 92 of the constitution. It was put to voters for approval in a referendum held on 28 September 1946.

Question
Do you approve of the proposed law for the alteration of the Constitution entitled "Constitution Alteration (Organised Marketing of Primary Products) 1946"?

The proposal was to insert into section 51 the following:51. The Parliament shall, subject to this Constitution, have Legislative power to make laws for the peace, order, and good government of the Commonwealth with respect to:
...
(i.A.) Organized marketing of primary products;
...
(2.) The power of the Parliament to make laws under paragraph (i.A.) of the last preceding sub-section may be exercised notwithstanding anything contained in section ninety-two of this Constitution.

Results

Discussion
This was the third occasion in which the commonwealth sought power to enact legislative schemes for the marketing of agricultural produce, having been unsuccessful in 1937 and 1946.

For a referendum to approve an amendment of the constitution, it must ordinarily achieve a double majority: approved by a majority of states (i.e., four of the six states) as well as a majority of those voting nationwide. This was the second of five referendums to achieve an overall majority, but fail the requirement of a majority of states.

See also
Politics of Australia
History of Australia

References

Further reading
 Standing Committee on Legislative and Constitutional Affairs (1997) Constitutional Change: Select sources on Constitutional change in Australia 1901–1997 . Australian Government Printing Service, Canberra.
 Bennett, Scott (2003). Research Paper no. 11 2002–03: The Politics of Constitutional Amendment  Australian Department of the Parliamentary Library, Canberra.
 Australian Electoral Commission (2007) Referendum Dates and Results 1906 – Present AEC, Canberra.

Referendum (Marketing)
1946 referendums
1946 (Marketing)
Aftermath of World War II in Australia